The House of Milton Jones is a radio comedy series which was first broadcast in 2003 on BBC Radio 4. It was written by Milton Jones and James Carey, and starred Milton Jones as himself, Olivia Colman as Milton's sister Susan, Nigel Lindsay as Susan's husband Ian, Tom Goodman-Hill as Anton, and Rosemary Leach as Milton's Aunt Dilys. Re-runs are broadcast on BBC Radio 4 Extra (formerly known as BBC 7 and BBC Radio 7).

Episodes

References

External links 

BBC Radio comedy programmes
2003 radio programme debuts